Chandragupta is a 1934 Hindi/Urdu historical film directed by A. R. Kardar. Produced by East India Film Company, the music direction was by K. C. Dey. Kardar had shifted to Calcutta where he joined the East India Film Company, and directed "hits" like Chandragupta. The film starred Nazir as Chandragupta. The cast included Gul Hamid, Sabita Devi, Mazhar Khan, Dhiraj Bhattacharya, Vasantrao Pehalwan.

The story, historical, involves the founder of the Mauryan Empire, Chandragupta Maurya, and his Machiavellian Brahmin advisor/Minister Chanakya. The film had a commercial success at the box-office and proclaimed Kardar as a "talented film-maker".

Cast
 Nazir
 Gul Hamid
 Sabita Devi
 Mazhar Khan
 Dhiraj Bhattacharya
 Vasantrao Pehalwan

Soundtrack
The music director is K. C. Dey.

Songlist

References

External links
 

1934 films
1930s Hindi-language films
Films directed by A. R. Kardar
Films set in the Maurya Empire
Indian historical films
1930s historical films
Indian black-and-white films